Keezhappatti is a village in Pudukkottai District, Tamil Nadu, India.

Villages in Pudukkottai district